Jonathan Marc Bairstow (born 26 September 1989) is an English cricketer who plays internationally for England in all formats. In domestic cricket, he represents Yorkshire, and has played in multiple Twenty20 leagues, including for Sunrisers Hyderabad and Punjab Kings in the Indian Premier League.

Bairstow made his One Day International (ODI) and Twenty20 International (T20I) debuts in 2011, and Test debut in 2012. He was part of the England team that won the 2019 Cricket World Cup.

Bairstow plays as a right-handed wicket-keeper-batsman. Along with Ben Stokes, he holds the world record for the highest sixth-wicket stand in Tests: 399 against South Africa during England's 2015-16 tour.

Early life
Bairstow was born on 26 September 1989 in Bradford, West Yorkshire, the second son of former Yorkshire and England wicket-keeper David Bairstow and the younger half-brother of former Derbyshire player Andrew Bairstow. He displayed early talent when he was chosen as the inaugural winner of the Young Wisden Schools Cricketer of the Year award, after scoring 654 runs in 2007 for St Peter's School, York. Bairstow also played for the Leeds United youth football team.

Early career
During the 2008 season, Bairstow played second XI cricket for Yorkshire. In six championship matches, he scored 308 runs at an average of 61.60. He was called up to the first-team squad for the final County Championship match of the season against Sussex but failed to make the starting eleven. He nevertheless signed a two-year contract with Yorkshire.

Bairstow began the 2009 season playing second XI cricket but after scoring 202 not out against Leicestershire seconds, he was called up into the first-team match with Somerset when Michael Vaughan was ruled out through injury. On his first-class debut he top scored in the second innings with an unbeaten 82. In Somerset's second innings he took over the gloves from an injured Gerard Brophy and took four catches.

Bairstow was a regular in the Yorkshire team in 2010, playing 16 first-class matches and scoring 918 runs. He averaged more than 40 for a second successive season, but could not convert any of his eight fifties into a maiden century. His performances led to selection for the England Performance Programme squad to tour Australia in 2010/11.

He took the gloves for the 2011 season and started well with the bat by scoring his first century against Nottinghamshire in May, finishing on 205. He was the only Yorkshire batsman to score over 1000 runs in the season and on the back of his strong performances was called up to the England one day squad.

International career

Breaking into the ODI and T20I teams – early career
Bairstow was a member of the England ODI squad for their match against Ireland in August 2011; however, he was not picked to play. He made his debut the following month after he was called up for the final ODI against India. Playing as a specialist batsman, he scored an unbeaten 41 off just 21 balls to help England reach a Duckworth-Lewis adjusted total. His innings included three sixes, the first off just the fifth ball he faced, and he was named Man of the Match.

On 11 October 2011, Bairstow hit a century off 53 balls as England beat a Hyderabad Cricket Association XI – during a warm up for a series against India.

On 25 February 2012, Bairstow was named man of the match in the second T20 of the series between Pakistan and England at Dubai International Cricket Stadium. England won the match.

After a successful start to the 2012 season, scoring two hundreds for Yorkshire, Bairstow was named in the England squad for the first test against the West Indies at Lord's, an injury having ruled Ravi Bopara out of selection. This was Bairstow's test debut, and close family friend and former Yorkshire and England cricketer, Geoff Boycott, presented him with his cap.

Bairstow was selected to play for the England Lions in one of the warm-up games for this series. He came in as the 7th batsman and scored 50 runs before being caught by Ravi Rampaul. Bairstow also made 5 catches throughout the match.

Bairstow made his debut in the 1st Test against the West Indies at Lord's. Bairstow's first major involvement in the test was when he caught Marlon Samuels for 31 runs. Bairstow came in as the Number 6 batsman in England's 1st innings and made 16 runs off 27 balls hitting 3 fours however he was out from an LBW bowled by Kemar Roach. Bairstow finished the series on a positive note (with England taking the series 2–0) and with an overall score of 38 runs.

Bairstow was not selected for the first two Tests as England went with Ravi Bopara (for the 1st Test) and handed James Taylor his debut in the Second Test for the 2012 South Africa series. However, he was recalled to the side for the 3rd Test and he made 95 in the first innings against South Africa before being bowled by an excellent ball from fast bowler Morne Morkel. He left the field to a standing ovation. In the second innings, England were set 345 to win, Bairstow came in with England struggling (Jonathan Trott was the only batsman to get into double figures) and he played some good shots but finally was bowled by Imran Tahir for 54 runs, this was not enough to help England to victory and South Africa won the match and won the series 2–0. He finished the Test series with 149 runs (the 5th highest scoring England player) having only played 1 Test.  Bairstow was then dropped for the first ODI in favour of Ravi Bopara who had an excellent ODI series against Australia.

Bairstow was selected in the England squad for the 2012 ICC World Twenty20 in Sri Lanka. Jonny played in England's first group game against Afghanistan, he came in as the number 6 batsman and made 12 runs from 10 balls before being caught to help England to get 196 runs for 5 wickets.  In Afghanistan's chase he caught Asghar Stanikzai off a Stuart Broad ball to assist England to a 116 run victory. The second and final group game was against India, England won the toss and sent India in to bat. Bairstow caught Virat Kohli from a Graeme Swann ball when Kohli was on 40, however India got to 170 runs in 20 overs setting England a target of 171. England's batting order failed and Jonny was bowled by Piyush Chawla for 1 run, England only made 80 runs (which was their worst for a Twenty20 International) and lost the match by 90 runs. They still qualified for the Super 8 stage. The first match in the Super 8's was against eventual champions West Indies, Bairstow took an important wicket when he caught opener Johnson Charles on 84 off of a Jade Dernbach bowl. He made amends against New Zealand as he caught opener Rob Nicol for 11 runs and then helped run out James Franklin who was on 50 and looking to really threaten England, Bairstow was needed in the 18th over and made 5 runs in 2 balls to help England to a 6 wicket win.  Bairstow was selected as the wicket keeper against Sri Lanka, he caught Kumar Sangakkara on 13 but his performance as the number 3 batter was poor as he only made 2 runs on the way to a 19 runs loss to Sri Lanka. This loss meant England were knocked out of the World Twenty20 and the West Indies took England's title as World Twenty20 champions.

Bairstow was included in the squad which travelled to India. Bairstow was selected to play in the Second Test after Ian Bell went home for the birth of his child. His first involvement of the test series came when he caught Zaheer Khan (India's last wicket) from a Graeme Swann bowl. He came in to bat as the 5th batsmen however he only managed 9 runs before he was caught by Gautam Gambhir, however Bairstow's dismissal was full of controversy as the ball hit the catcher's helmet first. Jonny continued to do well in the fielding department by catching India's dangerman Cheteshwar Pujara (who had scored a double century in the 1st Test and a century in the 1st Innings of the Second Test) for 6 runs which put England on the front foot in the Second Test. He also caught Yuvraj Singh off a Monty Panesar bowl. However he was dropped for the 3rd Test as Ian Bell returned to the tour following the birth of his child. He was selected for the T20 and ODI teams however he withdrew from both squads due to the illness of a family member, he was replaced by fellow Yorkshire man Joe Root on both occasions.

2013 to 2014

He was selected to be part of the Test, ODI and T20 squads for the 2013 Tour to New Zealand.

Bairstow was chosen to play in the first Twenty20 match of the series, he lost the wicket-keeping spot to Jos Buttler after Buttler put in a couple of great performances in the warm ups, this meant Bairstow would be used as specialist batsman coming in at number 5. He helped England to a 40 run win in the 1st T20I by smashing 38 runs in 22 balls before being caught by Martin Guptill, he also caught New Zealand danger man Ross Taylor on 13. In the Second T20I he caught Ross Taylor on 4 runs and also Colin Munro on 7 runs. Bairstow also played in the 3rd T20I, whilst fielding he caught both Brendon McCullum and Ross Taylor before they could post a decent score, he was not required to bat in England's successful run chase and finished up a 2–1 T20 series winner.

He was selected as the number 6 batsman for the 3rd Test as Kevin Pietersen was injured so Joe Root moved up to number 5 and struggled with innings of 3 and 6.

Not long after the series in New Zealand the Black Caps travelled to tour round England. Bairstow was selected in the ODI squad for the New Zealand's 2013 tour of England. His first involvement in the tour was to play for the England Lions against New Zealand in a four-day warm up match, where he batted at number 6 and got 68 runs before getting out to an LBW. He was selected for the 1st Test at number 6 due to the absence of Kevin Pietersen. He top scored for England in the 1st innings after getting 41 runs off 107 balls. Bairstow retained his place for the Second Test at Headingley where he came in and hit 64 off 99 balls and was involved in a 124 partnership with fellow Yorkshireman Joe Root. In the second innings, he made 26 off 22 balls before Alastair Cook declared. Bairstow finished the series with 136 runs (England's 4th highest scorer) as England won the series 2–0.

For the 2013 Ashes series, Bairstow was named in the squad as Nick Compton was dropped which allowed Joe Root to open the batting and leaving the number six spot free for Bairstow. He was selected as the number six batsman for the 1st Test where he made scores of 37 and 15. In the Second Test, he made 67 off 146 balls in the first innings and 20 runs in the second innings helping England gain a 2–0 series lead.

Bairstow was selected in the 2013-14 Ashes series squad however he did not play a match until he was called up to the team for the 4th Test. With England 3–0 down in the series Jonny replaced wicket-keeper Matt Prior after a poor run of form making Bairstow and his father the first father/son combination to keep wicket for England. In the 4th Test Jonny took 6 catches and performed well behind wicket but he could only get 10 runs in the first innings and 21 in the second innings. He finished the series with 49 runs.

2015 – becoming Test wicket-keeper

After being out of the England set up for 18 months, Bairstow was called up to the squad for the 5th ODI in New Zealand's tour of England. He replaced the injured Jos Buttler in the team and made two catches and a stumping before scoring 83* in 60 balls to help England to a win in a rain affected match. England won the match and the series 3–2.

After being omitted from the playing squad for the first two tests of the 2015 Ashes series, Bairstow had been named to start in place of Gary Ballance as a batsman for the last three tests. In the fourth Test he scored 74 as England won the match by an innings and 78 runs.

Bairstow kept his place in the England side for the series against Pakistan in the UAE in 2015. He made just 23 runs in the first match as England narrowly missed out on winning the game as bad light stopped play with them just short of their target. Bairstow scored 43 in England's first innings of the second Test, as they made 242. After making 41 in the first innings of the final Test, he made his first half-century of the series in his last innings, scoring 79, although it proved to be in vain as England lost the series 2–0.

After continued poor form in the Pakistani series by Buttler, Bairstow was announced as England's first-choice wicketkeeper in Test cricket. In the first test of the 2015–16 South Africa series, Bairstow, batting at number 7, made 41 runs. He followed this with an excellent 79 from 76 balls in the second innings, as England set the hosts a target of 416 to win. England went on to win the game in convincing fashion, by 241 runs. Despite missing an earlier opportunity against AB de Villiers, he became the first England wicketkeeper to take a stumping since 2012, removing Temba Bavuma for 0 off the bowling of Moeen Ali. In the second Test at Newlands in Cape Town, Bairstow scored 150 not out to record his maiden Test century. He and Ben Stokes (who himself scored 258) put on a world record 399 for the sixth wicket, as England moved from 167–4 to 629–6 declared. England wobbled in the second innings, but Bairstow hit an unbeaten 30 to ensure the match ended in a draw. He made 45 in England's first innings of the third Test, helping them surpass South Africa's first innings total. A good performance with the ball saw England win the game by seven wickets, to take a 2–0 lead in the series.

2016 to present

Bairstow scored 140 in the first game against Sri Lanka to help England out of a precarious situation in the 2016 series against England. He was named man of the match for his efforts, which also included taking nine catches, as England won the game to go 1–0 up in the series. He scored 48 in the second match, with England posting a big first innings score. He was not required to bat in the second innings as England won the match by nine wickets. He continued his excellent form into the final match of the series, where he scored an unbeaten 167 in England's first innings to help them to 416. He made 32 in the second innings, although rain ended the match, with no result being reached. England won the series 2–0, with Bairstow being awarded player of the series jointly with Kaushal Silva.

Bairstow scored 29 in England's first innings in the first Test against Pakistan. He made 48 in the second innings, but it was not enough to prevent a defeat for England. In the second Test, he scored 58 in England's first innings total of 589/8 as they won the match by 330 runs. He made 12 in the first innings of the third Test and followed this up with 83 in the second innings to help England turn the match around and secure an unlikely win. In the final match of the series Bairstow made 55 in the first innings as England made 328, and was dismissed for 81 in the second innings as Pakistan secured a ten wicket victory. He played in the fourth ODI against Pakistan and made 61 as England won by four wickets. England lost the fifth ODI by four wickets, with Bairstow making 33, as England won the series 4–1.

In the first Test against India in 2016, Bairstow scored 46 in England's first innings total of 537, and was not required to bat in the second innings. He also took six catches and a stumping in the match. In the second Test he made 53 in the first innings before making an unbeaten 34 in the second as England suffered a loss of 246 runs. In the third Test he made 89 in England's first innings total of 283, but after England conceded a first innings lead, he could make just 15 in the second innings as India secured an eight wicket victory. In the fourth Test he made 14 in the first innings, before making 51 in the second innings as England were dismissed for 195 to lose the match by an innings and 36 runs.

Bairstow played in the third ODI against India and made 56 as England posted 321/8 and won by five runs, although they lost the series 2–1. In the 4th Test of the home series against South Africa, Bairstow became the ninth England wicket-keeper to take 100 Test dismissals. On 19 September 2017, Bairstow scored an unbeaten 100 against the West Indies at Old Trafford to record his first century in ODI cricket. On 29 September 2017, Bairstow scored an unbeaten 141 against the West Indies at Rose Bowl, Southampton which is the highest score by an England batsman against the West Indies in ODIs, beating the previous best of 130 made by Marcus Trescothick in 2004.

On 15 December 2017, with Bairstow promoted to no.6 in place of the suspended Ben Stokes, he scored 119 runs against Australia. He was promoted to be an opening batsman in the limited overs series.

In 2018, he became the first English batsman to score three consecutive centuries in One-Day Internationals. For his performances in 2018, he was named in the World ODI XI by ICC and Cricinfo. On 14 May 2019 Bairstow scored 128 off 93 balls to help England to a win over Pakistan in a One Day International at Bristol County Ground.

He was named in the England squad for the 2019 cricket World Cup. He started the tournament with a golden duck against South Africa. Later in the tournament, he was out for another golden duck against Sri Lanka, becoming the fourth English batsman to be out for a golden duck twice in a World Cup tournament. However, he later amassed scores of 90, 111 and 109 against Afghanistan, India and New Zealand respectively. England went to win all three of these matches. England went on to qualify for the semifinal and defeated five times champions Australia in the semifinal, and eventually beat 2015 runners up New Zealand in a thrilling final. Although he scored just 36, England went on to win the match as well as the trophy after having the edge over the Black Caps on boundary count.

Bairstow was included in England's squad for the 2019 Ashes series. He averaged 23.77 with the bat throughout the series, making just one half-century. Bairstow was dropped from England's Test squad for the tour of New Zealand, with England selector Ed Smith saying 'He does drop out of the Test squad for these two Tests in New Zealand, which are not part of the World Test Championship, and I predict he'll come back stronger for having had a bit of time away from the Test set-up', leaving open the possibility of a return, amidst calls for Bairstow to work on his technique in red ball cricket. Bairstow returned to the team as a cover for the unwell Ollie Pope, making 9 and 25 before again being dropped from the side on Pope's return. Bairstow was already in South Africa at a training camp working on his red ball technique. He was then dropped from the squad for England's tour of Sri Lanka in favour of Keaton Jennings, which was criticised by some in the media as too 'short-term' an approach.

In July 2020, Bairstow was named in England's squad for the ODI series against Ireland, in which he played all three matches and scored 88 runs. On 6 September 2020, in the second T20I against Australia, Bairstow became the first batsman for England to be dismissed by hitting his own wicket in a T20I match.

In September 2021, Bairstow played all six matches for England at for the 2021 ICC Men's T20 World Cup, though he finished with just 47 runs and a top score of 16. He was picked for the 2021-2022 Ashes series, though did not feature in the team until the Third Test, where he replaced Ollie Pope who had suffered a poor run of form. In the fourth test he performed well, scoring England's only century of the series and helped them hold on for a draw in the final innings. He was ruled out for the final test after being hit on the hand in a net session. He scored a century in the first test of England's tour of the West Indies later the same year.

In June 2022, during the second test of the England v New Zealand Test series at Trent Bridge, Bairstow hit a match winning 136 off just 92 balls on the 5th day, as part of a successful England chase of 299. He was awarded man of the match for this innings. His hundred came off just 77 balls, making it the second fastest Test century by an English batsman. In the third test, Bairstow brought England back from 55–6 to score 162 at better than a run-a-ball en route to victory. He went on to score his third and fourth centuries of the summer in the rescheduled fifth test against India - his 114 not out in the fourth innings coming as England completed a record test match chase. He was ruled out of the 2022 T20 World Cup after breaking his leg in a golf accident. For his performances in the 2022 English Summer, Bairstow was awarded the Professional Cricketers' Association Men's Cricketer of the Year and the Cricket Writers' Club Bob Willis Trophy. He was also nominated for the 2022 Men's Test Cricketer of the Year and was named in the ICC Men's Test Team of the Year.

Franchise career
From 2016 to 2018, he played for Peshawar Zalmi in the Pakistan Super League.

In December 2018, he was bought by the Sunrisers Hyderabad in the player auction for the 2019 Indian Premier League.

In late November 2018, after the England v Sri Lanka Test series ended, Bairstow signed a short-term contract to play for the Kerala Kings in the T10 League in Sharjah – where he played alongside Eoin Morgan. In his second (and final) game for the franchise that year, he scored 84 not out off 24 balls – a new record in the format – helping his side record a 7 wickets win.

In the 2022 IPL Auction, Bairstow was bought by the Punjab Kings for ₹6.75 crores.

In The Hundred he was signed for Welsh Fire as an England centrally contract player for the 2021 and 2022 seasons.

Media 
In 2017, Jonny Bairstow published a biography titled A Clear Blue Sky, written with Duncan Hamilton. The book explores the loss of his father David Bairstow early in his life, and the journey from that to scoring his first test century, where he looks up to the sky in tribute to his dad, and sees "a clear blue sky" hence the title of the book.

References

External links

 

1989 births
Living people
English cricketers
England Test cricketers
England One Day International cricketers
England Twenty20 International cricketers
Yorkshire cricketers
Cricketers from Bradford
People educated at St Peter's School, York
Peshawar Zalmi cricketers
Sunrisers Hyderabad cricketers
Wisden Cricketers of the Year
Cricketers at the 2019 Cricket World Cup
English cricketers of the 21st century
Welsh Fire cricketers
Wicket-keepers
Punjab Kings cricketers